Ryan Glen Mason (born 13 June 1991) is an English professional football coach and former player. He became the interim head coach of Premier League club Tottenham Hotspur in 2021, becoming the youngest coach in Premier League history, at 29.

Mason progressed through the youth ranks at Tottenham Hotspur and made his first team debut in 2008. He was loaned to Yeovil Town, Doncaster Rovers, Millwall, Lorient and Swindon Town, and played his first Premier League match for Tottenham in 2014. After establishing himself in the Tottenham first team squad, he made his full international debut for England in March 2015. Mason moved to Hull City in 2016 for a club record fee, where he suffered a fractured skull in January 2017 in a match against Chelsea. After a prolonged treatment and on the advice of medical specialists, he was forced to retire from professional football in February 2018.

Early life
Mason was born in Enfield, London. As well as attending Enfield Grammar School, Mason attended Cheshunt School and was a District hurdles champion.

Club career

Tottenham Hotspur

Beginnings
Mason joined the Tottenham Hotspur academy aged eight, before signing a professional contract with the club in August 2008. He made his first-team debut in the group stages of the UEFA Cup on 27 November 2008, coming on as an added-time substitute for David Bentley in a 1–0 away win against Dutch club NEC.
During the 2008–09 season he topped the Academy scoring sheets with 29 goals in 31 matches as Spurs finished runners-up in the Premier Academy League.

Loans
On 13 June 2009, Mason went on loan to League One club Yeovil Town, along with teammate Steven Caulker. He made his league debut on 8 August in their first match of the 2009–10 season, a 2–0 win against Tranmere Rovers at Huish Park.
Mason made a promising start to his time at Yeovil, scoring from a free kick in his second match against Colchester United albeit in a 1–2 away defeat, and from a long-range strike in their next match against Exeter City to earn an away draw. The goal against Exeter was included in BBC Sport's "Goals of the Week". According to the Spurs website, "after impressing for Terry Skiverton's men at the start of the 2009–10 season, the loan deal was extended for a further three months". Along with fellow Tottenham loanees, Caulker and Jonathan Obika, on 5 November 2009, Mason's loan was extended until May 2010. He was recalled prematurely, on 13 March 2010, after playing 28 league matches and scoring six goals for Yeovil.

In August 2010, Mason was loaned for the first time to Championship team Doncaster Rovers on a two-month loan deal, and made five appearances. Then in January 2011, he was loaned back to Doncaster until the end of the season and made a further ten appearances.

On 28 July 2011, Mason signed a new two-year contract with Tottenham, keeping him at the club until June 2013. He was then immediately loaned back to Doncaster on a season-long loan. Mason was recalled back to Tottenham in November 2011 after making five appearances since the start of the season. On 29 December 2011, Mason and teammate Harry Kane agreed a loan deal with Championship club Millwall from 1 January until the end of the season.

Mason made an appearance in Tottenham's goalless draw in the Europa League group stages against Lazio at White Hart Lane on 20 September 2012, coming on as an added-time substitute for Mousa Dembélé. He made his first Tottenham start six days later in a League Cup last 32 match against Carlisle United, a 3–0 away win.

On the last day of the winter transfer window, Mason joined Ligue 1 club Lorient on loan for the remainder of the 2012–13 season, making his move out of England for the first time. It was terminated in April 2013 with Mason having failed to make a senior appearance.

On 23 July 2013, Mason signed on a season-long loan for League One Swindon Town, joining fellow Tottenham players Massimo Luongo, Grant Hall and Alex Pritchard. On 31 August, he scored a hat trick against Crewe Alexandra in a 5–0 win.

2014–15 season
After a successful pre-season in the United States with Spurs, Mason was included in Mauricio Pochettino's Premier League squad. On 24 September 2014, he made his first appearance of the season as well as scoring his first goal for Tottenham, an equaliser in a League Cup fixture against Nottingham Forest, which Spurs went on to win 3–1. Later that week, on 27 September 2014, he made his Premier League debut for Spurs in a 1–1 draw away at Arsenal. Mason subsequently established himself as a regular member of the first team.

On 2 November, against Aston Villa, Mason stuck his head in the chest of opponent Christian Benteke, who reacted by striking him with his hand. Referee Neil Swarbrick sent off Benteke but took no action against Mason. The incident led to both clubs being fined £20,000 by The Football Association (FA) for failing to keep their players under control. In January 2015, Mason was awarded a five-and-a-half-year contract, keeping him at the club until 2020. He started in the 2015 League Cup Final at Wembley Stadium on 1 March, in which Tottenham were beaten 2–0 by Chelsea. Mason scored his first Premier League goal, Tottenham's second of the match, in a 3–2 win against Swansea City.

2015–16 season
On 13 September 2015, Mason scored his second league goal for Spurs, an 82nd-minute winner in a man of the match performance which came in a 1–0 victory over Sunderland. In scoring the goal, however, he received an injury that ruled him out for several matches. He made his comeback from injury as a substitute in Spurs' 5–1 win against Bournemouth. On 18 February 2016, Mason captained the team against Fiorentina in a 1–1 draw in the UEFA Europa League. He then scored in a 3–0 win in the second leg, his second goal of the season.

Hull City and retirement
After a disappointing 2015–16 campaign with only eight league starts, Mason was bought by Hull City on 30 August 2016, for a fee believed to be around £13 million, a club record. He made his debut away to Burnley when he came off the bench to replace David Meyler after 73 minutes. He scored his first goal for Hull in a 2–1 EFL Cup win over Stoke City on 21 September 2016. On 22 January 2017, in a Premier League match against Chelsea, Mason suffered a fractured skull that required surgery after a clash of heads with defender Gary Cahill.

Mason underwent a successful operation on the head injury, and throughout the rest of 2017 went through a rehabilitation process in an attempt to return to playing. After the operation he had 14 metal plates in his skull, with 28 screws holding them in place. He also had 45 staples and a six-inch scar across his head. On 13 February 2018, it was confirmed that due to risks associated with the extent of Mason's injury, he would be retiring from professional football.

International career
Mason received his first call up to the England under-19 team for the match against Russia, but only made the stand-by list and did not take part in the match. He was called up for European Championship qualification in Slovenia in October 2009. Mason played in two of the three matches and grabbed the second England goal in the 2–0 win over Slovakia to help to ensure England's 100% record. Mason achieved his third and fourth caps for the U19s in friendlies against Turkey and the Netherlands respectively.

In February 2011, Mason received a call up to the England under-20 team for their friendly against France, and received his first cap coming on as a 70th-minute substitute in that match.

On 23 March 2015, Mason received his first call up to the senior England team for a European qualifier against Lithuania and a friendly against Italy, after Adam Lallana withdrew due to injury. He made his debut in the latter match on the 31st, replacing Jordan Henderson for the last 16 minutes of a 1–1 draw at Juventus Stadium, assisting Andros Townsend's late equaliser.

Coaching career
Mason joined the coaching staff of Tottenham Hotspur in April 2018. In February 2019, he suggested that heading should be banned for children. He was made the official academy coach for the Under-19 UEFA Youth League side in July 2019,
and then the head of player development (U-17 to U-23) in August 2020.

On 20 April 2021, following the dismissal of José Mourinho as head coach, Mason was named interim head coach of Tottenham Hotspur until the end of the season. At the age of 29, he became the youngest manager of a Premier League team; the previous record holder Attilio Lombardo of Crystal Palace was 32. Mason won his first match in charge of Tottenham, who beat Southampton at home 2–1 on 21 April. Four days later, the club lost the 2021 EFL Cup Final by a single goal to Manchester City. He oversaw five more games in charge, winning three and losing two with Tottenham finishing seventh at the end of the season.

On 4 November 2021, following the appointment of Antonio Conte as Head Coach, Mason was promoted to the role of First Team Coach after impressing Antonio Conte during his handling of leading training all week.

During Conte's health-related absences in February 2023, Mason worked closely alongside interim manager Cristian Stellini in the Tottenham dugout.

Personal life
Mason is married to Rachel Peters. Together they have a son, born in 2017, and a daughter, born in 2019.

Career statistics

Club

International

Managerial statistics

Honours

Player
Tottenham Hotspur
Football League Cup runner-up: 2014–15

Manager
Tottenham Hotspur
EFL Cup runner-up: 2020–21

References

External links

1991 births
Living people
Footballers from Enfield, London
English footballers
England youth international footballers
England international footballers
Association football midfielders
Tottenham Hotspur F.C. players
Yeovil Town F.C. players
Doncaster Rovers F.C. players
Millwall F.C. players
FC Lorient players
Swindon Town F.C. players
Hull City A.F.C. players
English Football League players
Championnat National 2 players
Premier League players
English expatriate footballers
Expatriate footballers in France
English expatriate sportspeople in France
English football managers
Tottenham Hotspur F.C. managers
Premier League managers
Association football coaches
Tottenham Hotspur F.C. non-playing staff
People educated at Cheshunt School